The Greek Orthodox Metropolis of San Francisco is an ecclesiastical territory or metropolis of the Greek Orthodox Church in the Pacific region of the United States, encompassing the states of Alaska, Arizona, California, Hawaii, Nevada, Oregon, and Washington. It is part of the Greek Orthodox Archdiocese of America and is led by a metropolitan bishop who serves as the priest of the mother church, Annunciation Cathedral in the City of San Francisco. Right Reverend Metropolitan Gerasimos was enthroned as the Greek Orthodox Metropolitan Bishop of San Francisco on April 2, 2005, following his election to that post by the Holy Synod of the Ecumenical Patriarchate in Phanar, Constantinople, Turkey.

Metropolitans of San Francisco
1979–2004    -  Metropolitan Anthony (Gergiannakis) of San Francisco
2005–present -  Metropolitan Gerasimos (Michaleas) of San Francisco

External links

 Official biography of Metropolitan Gerasimos from the Greek Orthodox Metropolis of San Francisco
 News release from the Greek Orthodox Archdiocese of America concerning Metropolitan Anthony's passing, with biography
 Greek Orthodox Archdiocese of America 2007 Yearbook

Eastern Orthodoxy in California
Culture of San Francisco
Greek-American culture in California
Dioceses of the Greek Orthodox Archdiocese of America